This is an alphabetized list of notable musicians who play or played percussion, excluding keyboard percussion. Only add names here if the person has their own article on Wikipedia, please.

A
Alex Acuña
Don Alias

B
Lekan Babalola
Cyro Baptista
Ray Barretto
Steve Berrios
Anthony Brown

C
Buck Clarke
Candido Camero
Lenny Castro
Mino Cinelu
Paulinho da Costa

D
Rubem Dantas
Roger Dawson
Xavier Desandre Navarre

F
Sammy Figueroa
David Friedman

G
Sameer Gupta
Trilok Gurtu

H
Giovanni Hidalgo
Zakir Hussain

J
Kevin Jones

M
Airto Moreira

N
Andy Narell

P
Armando Peraza
Chano Pozo
Tito Puente

R
Badal Roy

S
Poncho Sánchez
Mongo Santamaría
Arturo Stable

T
 Okay Temiz
Robert Thomas, Jr.
 Arto Tunçboyacıyan

V
Tony Vacca
Carlos "Patato" Valdes

References

Jazz percussionists
Percussionists
Percussionists